Viewtiful Joe: Red Hot Rumble, known in Japan as  is a video game for the GameCube and the PlayStation Portable. It is a slightly mission-based platform fighter/beat 'em up somewhat similar in style to Super Smash Bros. Melee and Power Stone, though it uses a modified engine from the previous games, featuring characters and powers from the Viewtiful Joe games and anime.

Plot
In this game, based on the anime series, Captain Blue is working on his latest film, and in order to determine who will get the lead role, he holds a battle tournament between those who are auditioning. However, as the player progresses through the films, it seems that some strange things are afoot, as unauthorized equipment keep showing up and things seem a bit too dangerous. Suddenly, Rachel is possessed by the equipment, transforming into Tsukumo. He silently arranges to sabotage the picture by stealing and replacing props and putting the crew in increasingly dangerous situations. He is enraged that all the mechanical cameras, microphones, and other movie-making devices are never given an actual role in the very movies they help to make. After Tsukumo is defeated, Joe explains that the  equipment plays an integral part in the process, so he leaves happily. Blue, meanwhile, decides to make Tsukumo the star of his picture, much to everyone's surprise.

Development
The game was originally announced under the title Viewtiful Joe: VFX Battle, and early reports stated that it was to be released for the PlayStation 2. Producer Atsushi Inaba noted that the game was inspired heavily by Nintendo's Super Smash Bros. Melee. Viewtiful Joe: Red Hot Rumble was originally developed as a two-player game rather than a four-player game. The PlayStation Portable version of the game features Dante from the Devil May Cry series as a playable character, along with several additional costumes based on characters from Devil May Cry and Viewtiful Joe: Double Trouble.

In Japan, the game featured a bonus stage set in the offices of V Jump magazine, which published the concurrently-produced Viewtiful Joe manga. In North America, the GameCube version featured in-game advertising promoting the Johnny Rockets restaurant chain.

Reception

Viewtiful Joe: Red Hot Rumble has received mostly mixed to average reviews from critics. The GameCube version of the game currently has a Metacritic score of 62 out of 100 and a GameRankings score of 63%. The PSP version of the game boasts slightly higher scores of 63 out of 100 and 66% on the two websites respectively.

Notes

References

External links
Official website 
(Wayback Machine copy)
Viewtiful Joe: Red Hot Rumble at MobyGames

2005 video games
3D beat 'em ups
Capcom beat 'em ups
Capcom games
Clover Studio games
Fighting games
GameCube games
Platform fighters
PlayStation Portable games
Multiplayer and single-player video games
Side-scrolling beat 'em ups
Superhero video games
Video games based on television series
Video games developed in Japan
Video games with cel-shaded animation
Video games with time manipulation
Viewtiful Joe